Rafał Lepel (born 13 February 1990) is a retired Polish biathlete. He competed at the Biathlon World Championships 2012 in Ruhpolding, in 10 km sprint. He competed at the 2014 Winter Olympics in Sochi, in the sprint contest.

References

External links

1990 births
Living people
Polish male biathletes
Biathletes at the 2014 Winter Olympics
Olympic biathletes of Poland
Place of birth missing (living people)